Señorita Panamá is a national beauty pageant in Panama. As of the 2021 edition, its winners represent Panama in Miss International and Miss Supranational. The Miss Panama brand started in 1952, when the Panamanian Institute of Tourism received an invitation from Miss Universe to send a representative. In 1975, the Señorita Panamá name was used for the first time, reverting to Miss Panama in 1976.  In 1982, Señorita Panamá was created by RPC Channel 4 as an alternative to send its winners to the Miss World contest in London. These pageants, along with smaller pageants such as Miss International Panamá and Miss World Panamá celebrated to select delegates for international representations.

History
The National Beauty Pageant was known as "Miss Panama" until 1975, when organizers decided to use "Señorita Panamá", a brand that lasted only one year.  Then, in 1982, "Señorita Panamá" was created as a rival of "Miss Panama" which sent its winners to Miss Universe.  The "Miss Panama" competition was then discontinued in 1988.

After 28 years, the Señorita Panamá pageant, organized by Medcom Corporation, was discontinued. A new organization took over in 2011 rebranding the competition as "Miss Panama", a name that had not been in use since 1987. (not to be confused with Señorita Panamá or Bellezas Panamá).

After five years of the Miss Panama pageant under the direction of Marisela Moreno, Medcom Corporation lost the franchise of Miss Universe in 2016, and the opportunity to select the candidate for this contest. César Anel Rodríguez and Justine Pasek acquire the rights of the title Señorita Panamá pageant and will select the candidate who represent the country in Miss Universe, Miss International, Miss Supranational and Miss Grand International.  Justine Pasek left the organization in December 2017 to focus on family.
2019 marks the 4th year of the national pageant under the direction of Rodriguez.

International participation

Panama has been represented in various international pageants, including the biggest names, such as Miss Universe,  Miss World and Miss International.

The country has won two major international titles: Miss International 1998 and Miss Universe 2002. Lía Victoria Borrero González won the Miss International 1998 while Justine Pasek, who represented Panama in Miss Universe 2002, won by default when she replaced the dethroned winner Oxana Fedorova of Russia.

Panama has not won the Miss World title. The country has 4 semifinalists and 2 finalist in Miss World with Lorelay de la Ossa in Miss World 1979, Marissa Burgos Canalias in Miss World 1983, María Lorena Orillac Giraldo in Miss World 1986, Nadege Herrera in Miss World 2009, Maricely González in Miss World 2012 and Solaris Barba in Miss World 2018 also winning for first time for Panama the title of Miss World America. The country's highest placement in Miss Earth was achieved by Stefanie de Roux who finished as top eight finalist in the Miss Earth 2006

From 2011 to 2015, the Miss Universe Panamá and Miss World Panamá were selected by Miss Panamá while Miss Earth Panamá and Miss Internacional Panamá were selected in the Bellezas Panamá pageant organized by Tania Hyman's Models and Talents. However, in 2012, the four titles (Miss Panama Universe, Miss Panama World, Miss Panama Earth, and Miss Panama International) were selected by one organization called, ORGANIZACIÓN MISS PANAMA. This year Miss Panama had two presidents Marisela Moreno and Tania Hyman.

Panama was represented in the international pageants of 2022 by the following representatives:
Miss Universe: Solaris De la Luna Barba Cañizales
Miss World: Kathleen Pérez Coffre
Miss International:Ivis Nicole Snyder 
Miss Earth: Valerie Clairisse Solís Valderrama

States, capital and regions
Although women from all over the country have been competing in the pageant for decades, 2011 was the first time in history that the contestants represented Panama's provinces and regions. The Miss Panama competition distributed its 20 finalists in the following regions:

Official states (10)

Official regions (7)
 Panamá Este (East side (Panamá  state))
 Panamá Norte (North side (Panamá  state))	
 Chiriquí Occidente (Occidental side (Chiriquí state))	
 Comarcas (Indigenous region of Panama)	
 Portobelo (Historical district of the Colón state)
 Atlantic Coast
 Pacific Coast

Official Island (7)
 Barro Colorado
 Coiba
 Contadora
 Flamenco
 Isla del Rey
 Isla San José
 Taboga

Regional rankings

	
	
The regional ranking is established according to the state of origin or representation of the miss (Miss Universe) and the year they won the title.

Titleholders 

The following women have been crowned Miss Panamá.

Winners gallery

Miss Panamá

History

The Miss Panama pageant, was born in 1952 when an invitation was received by tourism authorities to select a contestant for the purpose of sending advertising a Panamanian representative to Miss Universe contest in California, United States, which had been created that same year by the company Pacific Mills to promote its brand of bikinis "Catalina".

In 1977, Carolina Chiari acquired the rights of the pageant and created a televised contest. The winner went to Miss Universe and the 1st runner-up went to Miss World, until 1980. During the 1980s, the pageant was broadcast and promoted by Channel 2, which was the official Government network, giving place to endless rumors about affairs between the beauty queens and authority figures. The last edition of Miss Panama took place 1987 when the country entered the political and financial crisis which ended with the arrest of General Manuel Antonio Noriega.

Titleholders

 Color key

Miss Panamá (2011–2015)

History
In 2010 the corporation MEDCOM rights organization gave the Señorita Panamá contest the former Señorita Panama- Mundo (1995) Marisela Moreno who would be responsible for electing the representative of Panama at the Miss Universe and Miss World contest. Moreno acquired the rights of the former Miss Panama contest called again, with a choice format similar to that possessed the previous national competition.

Miss Panama was held between April to mid May after three months of preliminary events such as the Council or Misses runaway, in which the candidates are presented to the press and bands receive prizes and the sponsors . As a subsidiary Medcom group of companies, is responsible Telemetro live broadcast of the show, which usually includes presentations by renowned international artists. In 2011 and 2013 the event has taken place in the Teatro Anayansi Atlapa Convention Center.

The candidates are selected from groups of girls, either because they competed through regional casting or because they were chosen directly by the Organization Miss Panama, who decide the final number depending on the talent available this year. Usually there is one candidate for each of the 9 states of Panama, but the number may reach 12 due to the custom of including major geographic regions such as Western Chiriquí, Panama East - West and Central Panama. However, this does not mean that the contestants are in these regions or states, and that the final decision on who is participating in the competition authority of the president of the organization. Typically, the number of candidates ranges from 12.

In 2012, Miss Panamá acquired the national franchises to elect representatives to Miss Earth and Miss International thus Miss Panamá started to crown four winners in the following order: Miss Panamá Universe, Miss Panama World, Miss Panama Earth, and Miss Panama International to represent the country to the four major international beauty contests.

For 2013 Miss Panamá acquired the national franchise to elect representative to Miss Intercontinental Pageant, started to crown three winners in the following order: Miss Panamá Universe, Miss Panama World, Miss Panama Intercontinental.

The election of the new representatives of Panama takes place from 2011 to 2015.

Titleholders
 Color key

Señorita Panamá

History
In 1982, a new pageant was born, created by Channel 4 RPC. It was named Señorita Panamá and its winners were sent to Miss World until 1989. In 1990, the pageant acquired the franchise for Miss Universe and the contest crowned three winners: one for Miss Universe, another for Miss World and a third one that attended Miss Hispanidad from 1990 to 1995, Nuestra Belleza Internacional from 1996 to 1997 and Miss Asia Pacific from 1998 to 2000. The third title was eliminated in 2001.

In 2003, the contest was moved to November, therefore there was no time to elect a delegate for Miss World. Stefanie de Roux and Yanela de Sedas were offered the chance, but both declined due to their studies. That year, the Panama franchise was given to Bolivian-based Promociones Gloria, which conducted a small casting to select a delegate for Miss World. The winner was Ivy Ruth Ortega Coronas. Melissa Piedrahita represented Panama in Miss World 2004.

In 2008, the contest changed its name to Realmente Bella and was shown in a reality show format and is televise for Telemetro Channel. 10 girls lived together in a hotel and each week one of them was dismissed. The winner competed at the Miss Universe 2008 contest in Vietnam.

In 2009, the reality show took place again. For the first time in the Miss Panama contest, open casting calls were held, which resulted in complete failure as only about 17 girls in four cities showed up. 10 finalists were chosen to compete.
Finally in 2010 the pageant take the old format with a final night of coronation as in past years.

Titleholders
 Color key

Realmente Bella Señorita Panamá
In 2008, a new production team took over the contest, calling it "Realmente Bella" and transforming the beauty pageant into a reality show. This show had weekly galas where contestants took part in special challenges to raise the level of competition. In 2009, the contest became a public window where the participants were humiliated on national TV, tarnishing the image of the beauty contest. The name of the pageant was so harmed by this reality show that it was cancelled immediately after the 2009 final.

Two editions were held Realmente Bella Señorita Panamá 2008 and Realmente Bella Señorita Panamá 2009.

Señorita Panamá (2016–present)

History
in 2016 Medcom Corporation lost the right of Miss Universe pageant. Miss Universe 2002 Justine Pasek & César Anel Rodríguez acquire the rights of the title Señorita Panamá and the opportunity to select the candidate who represent the country in Miss Universe (2016 to 2021), Miss World (2016 to 2018), Miss International, Miss Earth (2015 to 2018), Miss Grand International (2019 to 2021) and in 2020 acquires the Miss Supranational franchise. Señorita Panamá S.A. organization it is the company that will manage and represent Panama in this beauty contests.

Titleholders
 Color key

Other pageants in Panamá

Miss Universe Panamá

History
In 2022 the Señorita Panamá Organization lost the right of Miss Universe pageant. Ricardo Canto acquire the rights of the title "Miss Universe Panamá"  creating a new contest that will select the representative to Miss Universe separately.

Miss World Panamá

In 2003, Corporación MEDCOM, which owned the rights to Miss World, could not produce a pageant in time to select a representative to Miss World in Sanya.  Therefore, the Miss World Organization contacted Promociones Gloria in Bolivia to help select a contestant; they were able to secure a contestant from Tania Hyman's Models and Talents for that year only, named Ivy Ruth Ortega Coronas.

In 2007, the Señorita Panamá pageant was not held and the agency Panama Talents, organizers of Mr. Panamá, got the franchise for Miss World. They organized a small contest called Miss World Panamá for 2007. In 2008 they appointed the 1st runner-up of the 2007 pageant to represent Panama but she was unable to travel to Johannesburg due to visa issues.  Therefore, Panama was not represented in Miss World 2008.

In 2009, Corporacion MEDCOM announced that they would crown a representative to Miss World, but the license was under the property of local businessman Olais Padilla who signed an agreement with the TV station so Nadege Herrera could compete.  In 2010 Padilla organized a local competition called Miss Mundo Panamá, won by Paola Vaprio Medaglia.

From 2011 to 2015 the Miss World license was awarded to Marisela Moreno of Miss Panama Organization.  After the dissolution of the Miss Panama pageant, Miss World awarded the license to event producer Edwin Dominguez, who had an agreement with Señorita Panamá for three years (2016-2018).

For 2019, a new competition will take place, completely separated from Señorita Panamá.

Miss Panamá International
 Color key

Some delegates of Panama were appointed to represent Panama in Miss International (officially titled The International Beauty Pageant) from 1960 to 2003. The first Panamenian delegate in Miss International was Angela María Alcové, sent in 1961.

Miss International Panamá

Created in 2004, this contest sends winners to the Miss International pageant in Japan. Tania Hyman's Models and Talents organize the pageant from 2004 to 2014. In the 2009 the Miss Internacional Panamá contest is fused to the new contest called Bellezas Panamá. From 2015 to 2016 other organization elected the new winner, in the 2017 the franchise was acquired by Cesar Anel to which eventually tied up with the Senorita Panama in 2017 to present.

Miss Earth Panamá
 Color key

Physical Modelos agency, which owned the Miss Asia Pacific license since the 1990s,was awarded the franchise from 2002 to 2007 when Carousel Productions changed the name of their event. Tania Hyman's Models and Talents acquired the franchise in 2001 and reacquired it for 2008 to 2014. From 2015 to 2018, the franchise was acquired by Señorita Panamá. From 2019 to 2020, the franchise is property of Miss Earth Panamá pageant under the direction of Diana Lemos Lee. In 2021 the franchise is acquired by Marlon Polo. In 2022 Panameña Universal org. acquired the franchise.

See also
 Mister Panamá

References

External links

 Señorita Panamá
 Bellezas Universales (Foro Oficial)
 Miss Panamá (Web Oficial)

Panama
 
Panama
1952 establishments in Panama
Panamanian awards
Panama